Annakodi is a 2013 Indian Tamil-language film directed and written by Bharathiraja. It stars Lakshman Narayan, Karthika Nair and Manoj Bharathiraja. The film has music by G. V. Prakash Kumar. The film was earlier titled Annakodiyum Kodiveeranum.

Cast
 Lakshman Narayan as Kodiveeran
 Karthika Nair as Annakodi
 Manoj Bharathiraja as Sadayan
 Manoj Kumar as Sanguni (Sadayan's father)
 Meenal as Narthanga
 Renuka
 Rama Prabha
 Subiksha as Kodiveeran's wife

Production
In August 2011, Bharathiraja revealed that the film would be titled Annakodiyum Kodiveeranum and would have a village centric theme similar to films such as Paruthiveeran and Subramaniyapuram. Parthiepan was signed on to play the title dual roles of father and son and subsequently completed a photo shoot for the film. Priyamani, Parvathi Menon of Poo fame and Meenal were initially announced to play heroines, although the first two were later replaced in the film. Karthika Nair was then signed on to play the leading female role of Annakodi, more than two decades after Bharathiraja had cast her mother Radha in her debut film. Iniya was selected to portray a character called Mallankinaru Mankatha after Bharathiraja was impressed with her performance in Vaagai Sooda Vaa. Reports also suggested that Vinay, who had previously appeared in Unnale Unnale and Jayamkondaan, was signed on to play a pivotal role although Bharathiraja's managers later dismissed the claim. In a turn of events, the day before the shoot began, Parthiepan was replaced by Ameer to portray the title roles, with Parthiepan admitting he was left in the dark about the decision.

When the Mullaperiyar Dam issue precipitated, Bharathiraja suspended the shooting of the film and sent his Keralan-born heroines home until the issue had died down. The film ran into further trouble when the tussle between the producers and FEFSI created disputes between the lead actor and director. Ameer, made remarks against the producers council and backed the FEFSI, and reports suggested that a displeased Bharathiraja opted to replace him in the film with Cheran. However Bharathiraja went on to claim that the "script needed some changes" which would not suit Ameer and thus signed on his own son, Manoj, to play the lead role. Iniya was also reported to have left the project due to the delay, but she denied such claims. But her role wasn't eventually incorporated in the film. Roja was selected to play the role of a wine seller and the mother of Karthika Nair. But she opted out of the film and lack of facilities was speculated to be the reason behind her decision. Renuka stepped into the shoes of Roja.

Filming
The movie started to roll from 17 November 2011. As announced, the film's inaugural pooja took place in Theni and several biggies from the film industry participated in it. Directors K. Balachander, Mani Ratnam, Balu Mahendra were at this launch which made the event at the Veerappa Ayyanar Temple in Alli Nagaram, Theni.

Soundtrack

The film score was composed by Sabesh–Murali, while the songs were by G. V. Prakash Kumar, the latter collaborating with Bharathiraja for first time.  After 21 years Gangai Amaran joined with Bharathiraja by writing lyrics for the film along with Vairamuthu, Egadesi and Kavingar Arivumathi. The audio released on 20 January 2013 at Railway grounds, Arasaradi, Madurai. Ilaiyaraaja, directors Mahendran, Balu Mahendra, K. Bhagyaraj, Vasanth, Vikraman, S. A. Chandrasekhar, Agathiyan, actors Raadhika, Radha, Sathyaraj, Saranya Ponvannan, composers Yuvan Shankar Raja, Karthik Raja, Bhavatharini, S. Thanu, Ramesh Khanna graced the event along with the film crew.

Release
Satellite rights of the film were secured by Sun TV. The film was given a "U/A" certificate by the Censor Board and released on 28 June 2013 alongside Thulli Vilayadu.

Critical reception
Rediff wrote:"film lacks depth and fails to ignite the passion needed for such an emotionally compelling story". Indian express wrote:"Long and dreary, and testing one’s patience at times, it’s a disappointing fare from the ace director". Behindwoods wrote:"To sum up, this melodramatic movie doesn't have a new story to tell and the closing message about love being beyond all such issues like caste, creed and religion is again a really dated thought". In.com wrote:"Overall, Annakodi is typical Bharathiraja style village story but it lacks the intensity and soul seen in the director's earlier ones". Baradwaj Rangan of the Hindu wrote "This material, stuffed with class and caste politics, is perfect for melodrama, with juicy twists and turns at every point. But, here, there’s no emotional core. The leads strike no sparks together – they could be siblings...and the drama doesn’t explode. A strange kind of listlessness settles over the proceedings, and we see a lot of things happening without being affected by any of it."

References

2013 films
Films directed by Bharathiraja
2010s Tamil-language films
Films scored by G. V. Prakash Kumar